Shari Noioso (born 14 October 2002), known professionally as Shari, is an Italian singer.

Biography 
Noioso was born in Monfalcone, and then grew up in Udine. She showed an immediate interest in music at the age of 10, starting to study singing and piano at The Groove Factory Academy.

In 2015, she took part in the second edition of Italian talent show Tú sí que vales on Canale 5 and, after successfully making it through the initial stages, performed during the final without making the podium. After the talent show experience, Shari obtained a recording contract with the label Warner Music, with whom he released covers of "Imagine" and "The Sound of Silence" and the debut single "Don't You Run". In 2016, Shari was a support artist for Il Volo during the L'amore si muove Tour.

In 2019, she collaborated with the duo Benji & Fede on the single "Sale", which was certified gold with over 35 000 units sold in Italy. In the same year, she was confirmed among the twenty semi-finalists at Sanremo Giovani 2019, but failed to obtain a pass to enter the Sanremo Music Festival 2020. In 2021, she collaborated with rapper Salmo on the single "L'angelo caduto", taken from the latter's studio album FLOP, which was also certified gold for its sales of over 35 000 units.

In July 2022, after obtainig a contract with Columbia Records, she released her debut EP Fake Music, which deviated from her previous works by being influenced by genres such as black music and soul. Shari manage to qualify in the top six, with her entry "Sotto voce", by rightfully accessing the festival in the  category. "Egoista" was later announced as her entry for the Sanremo Music Festival 2023.

Personal life 
Her boyfriend is the Italian rapper Salmo.

Discography

Extended plays

Singles

As featured artist

Television 

 Tú sí que vales (Canale 5, 2015) Contestant - Finalist
 Sanremo Giovani 2019 (Rai 1, 2019) Contestant
 Sanremo Giovani 2022 (Rai 1, 2022) Contestant - Finalist

References 

Italian pop musicians
Italian singers
2002 births
Living people
People from Monfalcone